Benavides (also called Benavides de Órbigo, Leonese: Banavices) is a municipality in the province of León, Spain. It is part of the route of St. James. As of 2018, the population is 2497.

References

Municipalities in the Province of León